The 2006 Japanese motorcycle Grand Prix was the fifteenth race of the 2006 Motorcycle Grand Prix season. It took place on the weekend of 22 –24 September 2006 at the Twin Ring Motegi circuit.

MotoGP classification

250 cc classification

125 cc classification

Championship standings after the race (MotoGP)

Below are the standings for the top five riders and constructors after round fifteen has concluded.

Riders' Championship standings

Constructors' Championship standings

 Note: Only the top five positions are included for both sets of standings.

References

Japanese motorcycle Grand Prix
Japanese
Motorcycle Grand Prix